The following is a list of notable people from Madurai, India.

Religious figures 

 Manikkavacakar
 Mangayarkkarasiyar
 Kulachirai Nayanar
 Santhananda
 Bodhisena
 Chithalai Chathanar

Scholars 

 Vida Dutton Scudder
 Augustus De Morgan
 S. Subramania Iyer
 Solomon Pappaiah
 Ganapathy Baskaran
 Sridhar Sundar Raman

Dancers

 Rukmini Devi Arundale - Bharatanatyam Dancer, Founder Kalakshetra
 Anita Ratnam - Indian classical and contemporary dancer.
 Sridhar Sundar Raman - Classical Belly Dancer

Entrepreneurs and business leaders 

 Karumuttu Thiagarajan Chettiar- Indian independence activist, industrialist and the founder of Thiagarajar College of Engineering and Thiagarajar school of management
 Sundar Pichai - CEO of Alphabet Inc. and its subsidiary Google Inc.
 RajaShree Birla -wife of Adhitya Birla

Journalists and Authors 
 Chitra Bharucha-Former Vice Chairman of the BBC Trust

Social Activists 
 Gopi Shankar Madurai - The Commonwealth Awardee, Youngest candidate in the Tamil Nadu Assembly election and also the first openly Intersex & Genderqueer person to do so.
 S. Swapna - first Indian transgender to take the TNPSC recruitment exam for public service employees in the Tamil Nadu state
 Narayanan Krishnan

Literature 

 Karmegha Konar
 S. Abdul Rahman
 S. Venkatesan
 Kausalya Hart
 Mu. Metha
 Ba.Venkatesan
 Dr.S.Tamilarasan (Madurai Sellur Upaathiyaayar)

Music

 M.S. Subbulakshmi
 T. N. Seshagopalan
 Madurai T. Srinivasan
 Madurai Mani Iyer
 T. M. Soundararajan
 Ramnad Raghavan

Film Industry

 Bharathiraja
 Ilaiyaraaja
 Maniratnam
 Ameer (director)
 Bala (director)
 Cheran (director)
 Chimbu Deven
 Kanika
 Karthik Subbaraj
 Ramarajan
 M. Sasikumar
 Shaam
 Susi Ganeshan
 Vivek (actor)
 Vadivelu
 Vijay Sethupathi
 Vijayakanth
 Samudrakani
 G. Gnanasambandam
 Pattimandram Raja
 C. V. Kumar
 Soori (actor)
 Srinivasan (Tamil actor)
 Velraj
 Shanmugarajan
 Ganja Karuppu
 Pandi (actor)
 Meenal
 Jayam Ravi
 Mohan Raja
 Robo Shankar
 Atlee (director)
 Shanmuga Bharathi (Writer, Vellaipookal)
 Solomon Pappaiah

Politicians and Public Servants 

 Mayandi Bharathi
 P. T. Rajan
 Palanivel Rajan
 Palanivel Thiagarajan
 S.M.Muhammed Sheriff Former Consecutive Member of Parliament
 Jana Krishnamurthi
 Nirmala Sitharaman, Minister of State (Independent Charge) for Ministry of Commerce & Industry
 R. Chidambara Bharathi
 P. Mohan
 Angidi Chettiar - Former Vice President of Mauritus 
 A. Vaidyanatha Iyer
 S. K. Balakrishnan
 S. Muthu
 Pazha Nedumaran
 P. Amudha

Sportsmen 
 A. Palanisamy
 Magesh Chandran Panchanathan

Software 
 Sundar Pichai

References

Madurai
Madurai